Tine Moberg-Parker (born 4 June 1969) is a Canadian sailor. She competed in the Europe event at the 1996 Summer Olympics, finishing in 13th place.

References

External links
 

1969 births
Living people
Canadian female sailors (sport)
Olympic sailors of Canada
Sailors at the 1996 Summer Olympics – Europe
Sportspeople from Oslo